The 1996 Preakness Stakes was the 121st running of the Preakness Stakes thoroughbred horse race. The race took place on May 18, 1996, and was televised in the United States on the ABC television network. Louis Quatorze, who was jockeyed by Pat Day, won the race by three and one quarter lengths over runner-up Skip Away.  Approximate post time was 5:33 p.m. Eastern Time. The race was run over a fast track in a final time of 1:53-2/5.  The Maryland Jockey Club reported total attendance of 97,751, this is recorded as second highest on the list of American thoroughbred racing top attended events for North America in 1996.

The race did not include Kentucky Derby winner Grindstone, as he was retired five days after his victory, when a bone chip was discovered in his knee. He was the first horse since Bubbling Over in 1926 to be retired immediately following a win in the Kentucky Derby.

Payout 

The 121st Preakness Stakes Payout Schedule

$2 Exacta:  (6–11) paid   $104.60

$2 Trifecta:  (6–11–10) paid   $613.40

$1 Superfecta:  (6–11–10–2) paid   $876.40

The full chart 

 Winning Breeder: Georgia E. Hofmann;  (KY) 
 Final Time: 1:53 2/5 * Record Time for Fastest Preakness
 Track Condition: Fast
 Total Attendance: 97,751

See also 

 1996 Kentucky Derby

References

External links 

 

1996
1996 in horse racing
1996 in American sports
1996 in sports in Maryland
Horse races in Maryland